AVANTI, otherwise referred to as AVANTI by Black Hole or written as A¥ANTI, is a sub-label consisting on trance and techno founded by Tiësto in 1999. The label was formerly known as Black Hole Avanti until 2001 when it stopped releasing material, but in 2008 the label was re-launched a first time under its new name with a re-design. After stopping releasing in 2014, the label was relaunched in 2016 by Kris O' Neil.

History

In 1999, the label's name was Black Hole Avanti, mainly releasing trance and techno music. Led by Tiësto, the label signed artists like Yahel, Vincenzo, or his friend DJ Montana among others. They stopped releasing music in 2002.

In 2008, after Tiësto departed from Black Hole Recordings, the label changed its name to Avanti, focusing on Progressive House and Trance, but slowly shifting into electro house. The label signed artists like Zoo Brazil, Beltek, Phunk Investigation, Jonas Steur, Robbie Rivera and DJ Ton T.B. among others. The label released music until 2012, where it marked its second stop.

Late 2016, Trance producer Kris O' Neil relaunched the label once more. The sound came back to its Progressive House and Trance roots, signing artists like Matt Fax and Luke Chable.

Catalog

List of releases

Albums
AVANTI DA 001 Various Artists - Avanti: Best of Part 1
AVANTI DA 002 Various Artists - Avanti: Best of Part 2

Singles

See also
List of electronic music record labels

References

External links
Black Hole Avanti at Discogs

Dutch record labels
Trance record labels
Record labels established in 1999
Record labels established in 2008
Electronic music record labels
1999 establishments in the Netherlands